Sneinton Asylum was a psychiatric hospital at Sneinton in Nottingham.

History

The Nottingham General Lunatic Asylum was the first such asylum to open in the United Kingdom. It was designed by Richard Ingleman of Southwell. The foundation stone was laid on 31 May 1810 and the first patients were admitted in February 1812. The facility initially accommodated 80 patients.

As demand for places increased additional facilities were required and it became necessary to augment capacity by establishing the Coppice Lunatic Hospital in 1859 and the Mapperley Asylum in 1880.

The facility eventually reached a state of decay and after services transferred to Saxondale Hospital near Radcliffe-on-Trent, the hospital closed in 1902. The asylum at Sneinton was later converted into a boarding school named King Edward's School. The school has since been demolished and the area has been redeveloped to create a recreation facility now known as King Edward Park.

References

Defunct hospitals in England
Hospital buildings completed in 1812